The Central Indo-Aryan languages or Hindi languages are a group of related language varieties Spoken across North India and Central India. These language varieties form the central part of the Indo-Aryan language family, itself a part of the Indo-European language family. They historically form a dialect continuum that descends from the Middle Prakrits. Located in the Hindi Belt, the Central Zone includes the Dehlavi (Delhi) dialect (one of several called 'Khariboli') of the Hindustani language, The lingua franca of Northern India that is the basis of the Modern Standard Hindi and Modern Standard Urdu literary standards. In regards to the Indo-Aryan language family, the coherence of this language group depends on the classification being used; here only Eastern and Western Hindi will be considered.

Languages
If there can be considered a consensus within the dialectology of Hindi proper, it is that it can be split into two sets of dialects: Western and Eastern Hindi. Western Hindi evolved from the Apabhraṃśa form of Shauraseni Prakrit, Eastern Hindi from Ardhamagadhi Prakrit.

 Western Hindi
Braj (1.6 m), spoken in western Uttar Pradesh and adjacent districts of Rajasthan and Haryana.
 Haryanvi (8 m), spoken in Chandigarh, Haryana,  and as a minority in Punjab and Delhi.
 Bundeli (3 m), spoken in south-western Uttar Pradesh and west-central Madhya Pradesh.
 Kannauji (9.5 m), spoken in west-central Uttar Pradesh.
 Hindustani, spoken in western Uttar Pradesh, Delhi, and after partition in Pakistan.
Hindi (322 m), a Sanskritized register of Hindustani, the most common language in India
Urdu (275 m), a Perso-Arabicized register of Hindustani, an official language in both India and Pakistan
 Eastern Hindi
 Awadhi (4.35 m), spoken in north and north-central Uttar Pradesh as well as the Caribbean, Fiji, Mauritius and South Africa
Caribbean Hindustani (166 k) 
Fiji Hindi (460 k) 
Bagheli (8 m), spoken in north-central Madhya Pradesh and south-eastern Uttar Pradesh.
 Chhattisgarhi (18 m), spoken in southeast Madhya Pradesh and northern and central Chhattisgarh.
Surgujia (1.7 m), spoken in Chhattisgarh

This analysis excludes varieties sometimes claimed for Hindi for cultural reasons, such as Bihari, Rajasthani, and Pahari. 

Romani, Domari, Lomavren, and Seb Seliyer (or at least their ancestors) appear to be Central Zone languages that migrated to the Middle East and Europe ca. 500–1000 CE in three distinct waves. Parya is a Central Zone language of Central Asia.

To Western Hindi Ethnologue adds Sansi, Bagheli, Chamari (a spurious language), Bhaya, Gowari (not a separate language), and Ghera.

Use in culturally non-Hindi regions

 Urdu is the official language of Pakistan. Although the native language of only 7% of the population (ethnic muhajirs), it is nearly universal as a second language among the literate.
 Bombay Hindi ("Bombay Baat"), the dialect of the city of Mumbai (Bombay); it is based on Hindustani but heavily influenced by Marathi. Technically it is a pidgin, i.e. neither is it a native language of any people nor is it used in formal settings by the educated and upper social strata. However, it is often used in the films of Hindi cinema (Bollywood) because Mumbai is the base of the Bollywood film industry.
 Dakhini, including Hyderabadi Urdu, and Bangalori Urdu, a dialect of Urdu spoken in the present areas of the erstwhile Hyderabad State, and the historical Deccan region. There is a small but distinct difference between Dakhini and standard Hindustani, which is bigger the further south it is spoken.
 Andaman Creole Hindi is a trade language of the Andaman and Nicobar Islands.
 Arunachali Hindi is a trade language of Arunachal Pradesh
 Haflong Hindi is a trade language of the areas adjacent to Haflong in Assam
 Fiji Hindi is an Eastern Hindi lingua-franca that developed among Indo-Fijians.

Comparison

References

Bibliography
 

 
Indo-Aryan languages
Languages of India
North India